Anchomomys is a genus of adapiform primate that lived in Europe and Africa during the middle Eocene.

References

Literature cited

 

Prehistoric strepsirrhines
Eocene primates
Eocene mammals of Europe
Eocene mammals of Africa
Prehistoric primate genera
Fossil taxa described in 1916